My Teacher is 2022 Philippine comedy-drama film directed by Paul Soriano starring Toni Gonzaga and Joey de Leon. It was produced under Ten17P. It was released theatrically on December 25, 2022 as an entry to the 2022 Metro Manila Film Festival.

Cast
 Toni Gonzaga as Emma, a school teacher.
 Joey de Leon as Solomon, a senior citizen dropout continuing his studies.
 Ronnie Alonte
 Loisa Andalio
 Pauline Mendoza
 Kych Minemoto
 Isaiah dela Cruz
 Hannah Arguelles
 Kakai Bautista
 Carmi Martin
 Ruffa Mae Quinto

Production
My Teacher, known under the working title The Teacher, was directed by Paul Soriano under Tincan and Ten17P. The story was written by Soriano's wife and co-star Toni Gonzaga. Gonzaga wanted to produce a film tackling about teachers, using The Intern Blind Side as inspiration for My Teacher. They also looked into stories of senior citizens returning back to school for the film's concept. Gonzaga has previously featured an elder who was a high school drop-out continuing their studies in her talk show Toni Talks. The team wanted to explore on how an elderly person in school dealing with their younger classmates who are more tech-savy. Production also had to deal with constraints caused by the COVID-19 pandemic.

Accolades

Release
My Teacher premiered in cinemas in the Philippines on December 25, 2022 as one of the eight entries of the 2022 Metro Manila Film Festival.

Reception
The film as described by BusinessWorld, "...[the film] drags on and on — some kilig dialogue, tearjerker moments, and inspiring soliloquies litter the narrative all until its very end."   According to PelikulaMania.com, the film was disappointing as it "touches [only] on certain issues like the unfair treatment of both the students and the teachers from people with authority, [but] lacks the substance in exploring the issues of why someone is taking his high school years as a senior citizen..."

References

Philippine drama films
Films about teacher–student relationships
Films impacted by the COVID-19 pandemic